Lovro Majer (born 17 January 1998) is a Croatian professional footballer who plays as an attacking midfielder for Ligue 1 club Rennes and the Croatia national team.

Club career

Early career
Majer was born in Zagreb in 1998. His father Egon hails from Preko on the island of Ugljan. Majer started his football career with the local team Dinamo Zagreb. He left the team at the age of 12. In 2013, Majer joined Lokomotiva youth academy.

Lokomotiva
In 2016, Majer was called up to the Lokomotiva first team. On 30 June 2016, Majer made his senior team debut in the UEFA Europa League qualifying phase against Santa Coloma at Estadi Comunal, replacing Eros Grezda in the 76th minute by coach Mario Tokić. On 17 July 2016, he made his Prva HNL debut in the matchday 1 against Dinamo Zagreb, replacing Ivan Fiolić in the 55th minute of the 3–1 loss. On 25 October 2016, he scored in the Croatian Football Cup in the 69th minute of the second round against Vinogradar. His goal led Lokomotiva to advance to the quarter-finals.

On 10 March, Majer scored a brace in a 4–1 away win over Dinamo Zagreb, which was a historic first win for Lokomotiva over Dinamo, with the club winning after 28 attempts. On 8 June 2018, Majer was awarded the Best Young Footballer award by the Croatian Football Federation for his performances in the 2017–18 Prva HNL season, and was also named in the Team of the Season. During his tenure at Lokomotiva, he sparked interest from Newcastle United and Sampdoria.

Dinamo Zagreb 
On 27 June 2018, Majer officially signed for Dinamo Zagreb and chose the number 10 shirt. On 27 July, in his league debut for Dinamo, he injured his ankle as Dinamo drew 1–1 with Rudeš. He was forced to undergo surgery and miss the first half of the season.

However, Majer was not getting many chances during coach Nenad Bjelica's tenure at the club. Most of it was due to the form of his teammate Dani Olmo who played in the same position. On 13 July 2019, in the Croatian Super Cup, Majer was substituted on for Izet Hajrović in the 82nd minute and received two yellow cards within three minutes. On 11 December, he made his Champions League debut as Dinamo lost 4–1 to Manchester City. Dissatisfied with his status in the team, Majer was on the verge of signing for Birmingham City in July 2020, but the move was stopped by Dinamo. After both Bjelica and his successor Igor Jovićević got fired, new coach Zoran Mamić began relying on Majer more, which led to an impressive performance against Varaždin on 24 July 2020, when he scored the opener and provided Mario Ćuže with an assist for the second goal in the 2–0 victory.

Ahead of the 2020–21 season, Dinamo's league rivals Osijek attempted to sign Majer, but failed to do so as Dinamo refused to sell the player. On 16 August, in the first game of the season, he scored a brace in a 6–0 victory over his former club Lokomotiva. Following his good performances during the beginning of the season, Italian media reported that Milan scouts watched Majer in the Europa League match against Feyenoord that ended in a goalless draw on 22 October. On 16 November, Majer tested positive for COVID-19, which forced him to miss the derby against Osijek, now coached by Bjelica, on 21 November. Upon completion of the Europa League group stage, Majer was praised for his performances, as Dinamo topped their group with Majer scoring twice and assisting three times in the process. On 21 December, Majer signed a new contract, tying him up with the club until 2026. During the winter transfer window, Majer attracted attention of Zenit Saint Petersburg, Fiorentina and Marseille, but Dinamo refused to sell the player, dissatisfied with the offered transfer fees.

On 25 August 2021, in the second leg of the Champions League play-offs against Sheriff Tiraspol, Majer made his hundredth and final appearance for Dinamo.

Rennes 
On 26 August 2021, Majer signed a five-year deal with Ligue 1 side Rennes for €12 million with add-ons. He made his league debut three days later, in a 2–0 loss to Angers, getting substituted on for Benjamin Bourigeaud in the 82nd minute. Majer established himself as a key member of the team during the autumn, resulting in a breakthrough performance during the 4–1 victory over Lyon on 7 November. He scored his first goal for Rennes on 20 November, in a 2–0 league victory over Montpellier. On 5 December, he provided Martin Terrier with three assists for his hat-trick, and set Yvann Maçon's own goal alongside Lorenz Assignon, as Rennes defeated Saint-Étienne 5–0. At the end of the season, during which he was praised for his performances, Majer accumulated six goals and nine assists and was named in the Ligue 1 team of the season by L'Équipe.

International career 
Majer debuted for senior Croatia team on 28 May 2017, playing the last three minutes in a 2–1 friendly win over Mexico.

On 7 June 2019, he was named in Nenad Gračan's 23-man squad for UEFA Under-21 Euro 2019. He made only one appearance in the group stage, in the 3–3 draw with England when Croatia were already eliminated. On 9 March 2021, he was again named in Igor Bišćan's 23-man squad for the group stage of UEFA Under-21 Euro 2021. Despite spending most of the tournament on the bench due to a minor injury, he provided Domagoj Bradarić with an assist for Croatia's only goal in the final group game, the 2–1 defeat to England, which turned out to be a decisive one as Croatia progressed to the knockout stage due to a better goal difference.

On 17 May 2021, he was included in Zlatko Dalić's preliminary 34-man squad for the UEFA Euro 2020; however, he did not make the final 26. On 11 November 2021, Majer scored his first two goals for the national team in the 7–1 victory over Malta in the 2022 World Cup qualifying. On 9 November 2022, he was named in Croatia's final 26-man squad for the 2022 FIFA World Cup. He opened his World Cup scoring with a goal in the 4–1 group stage victory over Canada. In the quarter-final against Brazil, he scored a penalty in the shootout, which Croatia won 4–2 and progressed to the semi-finals.

Career statistics

Club

International

Scores and results list Croatia's goal tally first, score column indicates score after each Majer goal.

Honours
Dinamo Zagreb
Prva HNL: 2018–19, 2019–20, 2020–21
Croatian Cup: 2020–21
Croatian Super Cup: 2019
Croatia
 FIFA World Cup third place: 2022

Individual
Football Oscar — Best Prva HNL U-21 Player: 2017, 2018
Football Oscar — Prva HNL Team of The Year: 2018
HNS Trophy — Best Young Player: 2018

References

External links
 
 Profile at GNKDinamo.hr
 

1998 births
Living people
Footballers from Zagreb
Association football midfielders
Croatian footballers
Croatia youth international footballers
Croatia under-21 international footballers
Croatia international footballers
NK Lokomotiva Zagreb players
GNK Dinamo Zagreb players
Stade Rennais F.C. players
Croatian Football League players
Ligue 1 players
2022 FIFA World Cup players
Croatian expatriate footballers
Expatriate footballers in France
Croatian expatriate sportspeople in France